Skylab Two may refer to:

 Skylab II, NASA L2 space station concept
 Skylab 2 (SL-2), second mission in the Skylab space station program
 Skylab 3 (SLM-2), the second crewed mission to the Skylab space station
 Skylab B, backup Skylab space station
 Skylab II (album), an album by Rogério Skylab

See also
 Skylab (disambiguation)